Oregon Battle of the Books (OBOB) is a trivia-style reading competition where students grades 3 to 12 compete against one another by answering a series of questions based upon a list of books they are given at the beginning of the year. The list is around 15 books long and questions will be asked of any of the books for that age division in Jeopardy! style.

For the preliminary tournament it starts off in pool play style tournaments, then the next round is in the style of stepladder or bracket play. Students can choose to participate in the local, district, regional, and state level of the program.

History 
The Oregon Battle of the Books Committee is a volunteer-based group established in 2006 supported by the Oregon Association of School Libraries (or OASL). The idea was sparked by the Chicago Public Library who in the mid-1900s had a radio show with a similar concept. In the 1970s, author Sybilla Cook introduced the idea in Oregon, but it was not until 2006 that it got funding from the State Library of Oregon.

Regions

Controversy 

For the 2018-19 school year, Alex Gino's George was one of the 16 novels selected for students to read. It is a novel about a 10-year-old transgender girl who goes by the name of Melissa. It is a coming of age novel targeted for students aged 8 to 12. Despite all the praise the book received from its initial release, it was featured two years in a row on the American Library Association's list titled "10 Most Challenged Books" for years 2016 and 2017.

Two school districts, Hermiston School District and Cascade School District, both decided to drop from the competition. They claimed that the content of the book was too mature for the students but mentioned that it had nothing to do with transgender rights.

References

External links

 

Annual events in Oregon
Education in Oregon
Library-related organizations
Education competitions in the United States
Student competitions
2006 establishments in Oregon
Organizations established in 2006
Organizations based in Oregon